Barskoon Waterfall is a geological protected area located in Jeti-Ögüz District of Issyk-Kul Region of Kyrgyzstan. It sits 90 km to the south-west of Karakol on one of the tributaries of the river Barskoon. There are several waterfalls at the site, which is located 20 km south of the village of Barskoon. National Monument status was established in 1975.

According to one legend, the waterfall was created from the tears of a female leopard who cried over the injured cubs that fell off a cliff.

On the way to Barskoon, two monuments were erected. One is a Soviet truck on a wide pedestal, and the other is a bust of Yuri Gagarin.

References
 

Natural monuments of Kyrgyzstan
Protected areas established in 1975
Waterfalls of Kyrgyzstan